The canton of Val de Tardoire is an administrative division of the Charente department, southwestern France. It was created at the French canton reorganisation which came into effect in March 2015. Its seat is in La Rochefoucauld-en-Angoumois.

It consists of the following communes:
 
Agris
Bunzac
Charras
Chazelles
Coulgens
Écuras
Eymouthiers
Feuillade
Grassac
Mainzac
Marillac-le-Franc
Marthon
Montbron
Moulins-sur-Tardoire
Orgedeuil
Pranzac
Rivières
La Rochefoucauld-en-Angoumois
La Rochette
Rouzède
Saint-Adjutory
Saint-Germain-de-Montbron
Saint-Sornin
Souffrignac
Taponnat-Fleurignac
Vouthon
Yvrac-et-Malleyrand

References

Cantons of Charente